Brooke Walker may refer to:

Brooke Walker (cricketer) (born 1977), New Zealand cricketer
Brooke Walker (gymnast) (born 1982), Australian gymnast
Brooke Walker (sportswoman) (born 1995), Australian rules footballer